Pseudodirphia is a genus of moths in the family Saturniidae first described by Eugène Louis Bouvier in 1928.

Species
The genus includes the following species:

Pseudodirphia agis (Cramer, 1775)
Pseudodirphia alba (Druce, 1911)
Pseudodirphia albosignata (Bouvier, 1924)
Pseudodirphia alticola Lemaire, 2002
Pseudodirphia andicola Bouvier, 1930
Pseudodirphia biremis (Draudt, 1930)
Pseudodirphia boliviana Lampe, 2004
Pseudodirphia catarinensis (Lemaire, 1975)
Pseudodirphia choroniensis (Lemaire, 1975)
Pseudodirphia conjuncta Lemaire, 2002
Pseudodirphia cupripuncta Lemaire, 1982
Pseudodirphia ducalis Lemaire, 2002
Pseudodirphia eumedide (Stoll, 1782)
Pseudodirphia eumedidoides (Vuillot, 1892)
Pseudodirphia frickei Meister & Brechlin, 2008
Pseudodirphia guyanensis (Lemaire, 1975)
Pseudodirphia herbuloti (Lemaire, 1975)
Pseudodirphia imperialis (Draudt, 1930)
Pseudodirphia infuscata (Bouvier, 1924)
Pseudodirphia lacsa Lemaire, 1996
Pseudodirphia lesieuri Lemaire, 2002
Pseudodirphia marxi Brechlin & Meister, 2008
Pseudodirphia medinensis (Draudt, 1930)
Pseudodirphia menander (Druce, 1886)
Pseudodirphia mexicana (Bouvier, 1924)
Pseudodirphia niceros (Dognin, 1911)
Pseudodirphia obliqua (Bouvier, 1924)
Pseudodirphia pallida (Walker, 1865)
Pseudodirphia peruviana (Bouvier, 1924)
Pseudodirphia regia (Draudt, 1930)
Pseudodirphia sanctimartinensis Lemaire, 2002
Pseudodirphia singeri Meister & Brechlin, 2008
Pseudodirphia sinuosa Lemaire, 2002
Pseudodirphia theodorici Lemaire, 1982
Pseudodirphia thiaucourti Lemaire, 1982
Pseudodirphia undulata Lemaire, 2002
Pseudodirphia uniformis (Lemaire, 1975)
Pseudodirphia varia (Walker, 1855)
Pseudodirphia varioides Brechlin, 2018
Pseudodirphia weritzi Brechlin & Meister, 2008

References

Hemileucinae
Taxa named by Eugène Louis Bouvier